Al Hamra'a (aka Al Hamra) is a subject of Baladiyah al-Rawdah and a neighborhood in Riyadh, Saudi Arabia.

Located in the northeastern part of the city, Al Hamra'a hosts a number of sites and local landmarks, such as Al Hamra'a Park, Al Hokair Land, Star City Park, Al Marsa Resorts, Riyadh Najed Schools, Sanad Hospital, Jarir Bookstore, The Water Splash, etc.

Landmarks
The following are landmarks in Al Hamra'a:

 Al Hamra Park
 Al Hokair Land
 Star City Park
 Al Marsa Resorts
 The Water Splash
 Riyadh Najed Schools
 Sanad Hospital
 El Seif Engineering
 Jarir Bookstore

References

Neighbourhoods in Riyadh